This is a list of diplomatic missions of Saint Vincent and the Grenadines. Saint Vincent and the Grenadines' diplomatic network does not extend to any neighbouring Caribbean countries.  The country also has tourism representatives and honorary consulate in other countries (not listed below). Its embassy and mission to the European Union in Brussels and its embassy in Morocco is shared with other East Caribbean states.

Africa
 
 Rabat (Embassy)

Americas

 Toronto (Consulate-General)

 Havana (Embassy) 

 Washington, D.C. (Embassy)
 New York City (Consulate-General)

 Caracas (Embassy)

Asia

 Taipei (Embassy)

Europe

 Brussels (Embassy)

 London (High Commission)
 Comber (Consulate-General)

Multilateral organisations
  World Trade Organization
Geneva (Permanent Mission)
 
New York City (Permanent Mission)
 
Washington, D.C. (Permanent Mission)

Gallery

See also

 Foreign relations of Saint Vincent and the Grenadines
 List of diplomatic missions in Saint Vincent and the Grenadines

References

External links
 Ministry of Foreign Affairs of Saint Vincent and the Grenadines
 Details of diplomatic missions of Saint Vincent and the Grenadines

Diplomatic missions
Saint Vincent and the Grenadines